This is a list of VTV dramas released in 2009.

←2008 - 2009 - 2010→

VTV Tet dramas
These single-episode dramas air on VTV channels during Tet holiday.

VTV1

VTV3

VTV1 Weeknight Prime-time dramas
These dramas air from 20h10 to 21h, Monday to Friday on VTV1.
Note: Starting on April 22, the time slot was split in two ('Monday to Wednesday' & 'Thursday and Friday') in order to air 2 dramas per week instead of only one as before.

Monday-Wednesday dramas

Thursday-Friday dramas

VTV3 Weeknight Prime-time dramas

Monday-Wednesday dramas
These dramas air from 21h to 21h50, Monday to Wednesday on VTV3.

Thursday-Saturday dramas
Starting on 9 July 2009, VTV adds Saturday prime-time to this time slot.

These dramas air from 21h to 21h50, Thursday to Saturday on VTV3.

VTV3 Saturday/Sunday Afternoon - Rubic 8 dramas

Saturday/Sunday Afternoon dramas
These dramas air in early afternoon, Saturday or Sunday on VTV3 as a part of the programs Cinema for Saturday Afternoon or Sunday Literature & Art. Both of these time slots had been replaced by Rubic 8 time slot since February 28.

Rubic 8 dramas
New time slot was opened in 2009 as a collaboration of VFC and Galaxy Studio.

These dramas air from 14h30 to 15h15, Saturday and Sunday on VTV3 as a part of the program Rubic 8.

See also
 List of dramas broadcast by Vietnam Television (VTV)
 List of dramas broadcast by Hanoi Radio Television (HanoiTV)
 List of dramas broadcast by Vietnam Digital Television (VTC)

References

External links
VTV.gov.vn – Official VTV Website 
VTV.vn – Official VTV Online Newspaper 

Vietnam Television original programming
2009 in Vietnamese television